Polychrus jacquelinae or Jacqueline's bush anole is a species of bush anole. It is endemic to Peru and was dedicated to Jacqueline Maria Charles. It can be found in elevations of 1,460 to 1,570 meters.

References 

Polychrotidae
Lizards of South America
Reptiles of Peru
Endemic fauna of Peru
Reptiles described in 2011